Robb W. Glenny is an American pulmonologist.

Glenny graduated from the University of Virginia School of Medicine in 1984, and completed a fellowship at the University of Washington, followed by a residency and internship at Duke University Medical Center.  He later returned to the University of Washington where he holds an endowed professorship in pulmonary research. In 1999, Glenny was awarded a Guggenheim fellowship.

References

Living people
Year of birth missing (living people)
20th-century American physicians
21st-century American physicians
University of Washington faculty
University of Virginia School of Medicine alumni
American pulmonologists